Yuhanon Policarpos is Metropolitan of Angamaly Diocese of Malankara Orthodox Syrian Church.

References

1955 births
Living people
Malankara Orthodox Syrian Church bishops